Friederike Möhlenkamp (born 19 November 1992) is a German sprinter. She competed in the 4 × 400 metres relay at the 2016 European Athletics Championships and in the 4 x 400 metres relay at the 2016 Summer Olympics.

Early life
Möhlenkamp was born in Greven. She attended Gymnasium Martinum in Emsdetten, where she completed her abitur in 2012.

References

External links
 

1992 births
Living people
German female sprinters
People from Steinfurt (district)
Sportspeople from Münster (region)
Olympic athletes of Germany
Athletes (track and field) at the 2016 Summer Olympics
Olympic female sprinters